Daouda Guèye Diémé (born 23 October 1989) is a Senegalese professional footballer who plays as a striker for Iraqi club Al-Qasim.

Club career 
Diémé began his career at Ziguinchor-based club Zig Inter; he then played for Port Autonome and Jaraaf, whom he captained in the Senegal Premier League. He was one of five nominees for best local player in 2018.

Following a season at Bekaa in the Lebanese Premier League, Diémé joined Shabab Sahel on 22 May 2019. He moved to Ahed on 27 January 2020, to compete in the 2020 AFC Cup. On 19 January 2021, Diémé transferred to Al-Qasim in the Iraqi Premier League.

International career 
Diémé represented Senegal internationally at the 2018 African Nations Championship qualification, scoring a goal in a 3–1 win over Sierra Leone on 22 July 2017.

Career statistics

International 

 Scores and results list Senegal's goal tally first, score column indicates score after each Diémé goal.

Honours 
Shabab Sahel
 Lebanese Elite Cup: 2019

References

External links 

 
 
 
 

1989 births
Living people
People from Ziguinchor
Senegalese footballers
Association football forwards
Port Autonome players
ASC Jaraaf players
Bekaa SC players
Shabab Al Sahel FC players
Al Ahed FC players
Al-Qasim SC players
Senegal Premier League players
Lebanese Premier League players
Iraqi Premier League players
Senegal international footballers
Senegalese expatriate footballers
Senegalese expatriate sportspeople in Lebanon
Senegalese expatriate sportspeople in Iraq
Expatriate footballers in Lebanon
Expatriate footballers in Iraq